Panemunė is a town in Lithuania. It is a border checkpoint for traffic to and from Russia (Kaliningrad Oblast).

The magnificent Queen Louise Bridge (which still exists, built in 1907, though now badly scarred by World War II and rebuilt in 1946) links Panemunė to the city of Sovetsk (Tilsit until 1946) just south across the river. The landmark arch now lies on the Russian side.

History
The area comprising today's Panemunė used to be the northern trans-Memel (Neman) suburb of Tilsit, then a Prussian and later also German town (as of 1871). Then Tilsit sat close to the border between Germany and Russia.

After Germany's defeat in World War I, the trans-Memel suburb was disentangled from Tilsit (with the rest of the Memelland/Klaipėda Region detached from the Province of East Prussia) in 1920. The suburb was given the name Übermemel, which means over the Memel river in German.

French administered the area pursuant to the Treaty of Versailles, establishing the League of Nations mandate of Memel/Klaipėda. In 1923 the restored Lithuania annexed the Memelland after the Klaipėda Revolt and Übermemel was given the name Panemunė. Germany re-acquired Panemunė (with all of Memelland) on 23 March 1939 – its last peaceful territorial gain before the Second World War. So Panemunė (Übermemel) was reintegrated into the city of Tilsit.

Following World War II, the whole area was seized by the Soviet Union and in 1947 Übermemel, renamed as Panemunė (like all the Klaipėda Region) became part of the Lithuanian Soviet Socialist Republic. The town's German minority was expelled.

Border crossing
A joint project between Lithuania and Russia is currently underway to construct a new modern border crossing route for vehicles to bypass both Panemunė and the Russian city of Sovetsk. The goal is to relieve both towns of the congestion and to bring the crossing up to modern standards. The bypass involves a new bridge over the Neman river and new bypass roads around the towns. Once complete the existing border crossing over the historic Queen Louise Bridge will be for pedestrian use only.

See also
Panemunė Castle, 80 km to the east, in the municipality Vytėnai

References

Cities in Lithuania
Cities in Tauragė County